The Whidden–Kerr House and Garden, also known as High Hatch Estate, is a historic property located in the unincorporated communities of Riverwood and Dunthorpe in Multnomah County, Oregon, south of Portland and north of Lake Oswego, Oregon. William M. Whidden of Whidden & Lewis designed the house in 1901, to be his own residence, and it was built the same year. Whidden and his family lived in the house until 1911, when he sold it to businessman Thomas Kerr, Sr. (1896–1925). It later passed to Kerr's son, Thomas Kerr, Jr., and ultimately remained with the Kerr family until 1987.

The house is the "best expression" of Prairie School architecture by Whidden & Lewis, one of Portland's most prominent architectural firms of the period. A separate carriage house, now in use as a garage, is included as a contributing feature in the historic designation. The property includes a formal garden, which was "further developed by Kerr and his wife, the former Mabel Macleay", after Kerr acquired the estate in 1911.  The site overlooks the Willamette River.

The property was listed on the National Register of Historic Places in 1988.

See also
 National Register of Historic Places listings in Multnomah County, Oregon

References

1901 establishments in Oregon
Houses completed in 1901
Houses in Multnomah County, Oregon
Houses on the National Register of Historic Places in Oregon
National Register of Historic Places in Multnomah County, Oregon
Prairie School architecture in Oregon
Portland Historic Landmarks